The 1999 Rhein Fire season was the fifth season for the franchise in the NFL Europe League (NFLEL). The team was led by head coach Galen Hall in his fifth year, and played its home games at Rheinstadion in Düsseldorf, Germany. They finished the regular season in third place with a record of six wins and four losses.

Offseason

Free agent draft

Personnel

Staff

Roster

Schedule

Standings

Game summaries

Week 3: vs Amsterdam Admirals

Week 6: at Amsterdam Admirals

Notes

References

Rhein Fire seasons
Rhein
Rhein